Electrocrania is an extinct genus of micropterigid moth. It is known from two species found in Eocene aged Baltic amber. The genus was originally described by Nikolai Yakovlevich Kuznetsov in 1941. The genus was subsequently synonymised with Micropterix, until a second species was described in 2015, which restored it as a distinct genus.

References

†
†
Fossil Lepidoptera
Baltic amber